Lauren Swayne Barthold (born 1965) is an American philosopher and Philosophy Professor at Emerson College. Previously she was Associate Professor of Philosophy at Gordon College, with tenure, and has also taught at Haverford College, Siena College and Endicott College. Barthold is known for her works on Gadamer's thought.
She is a co-founder and former president of the North American Society of Philosophical Hermeneutics. 
In 2018 she co-founded the Heathmere Center for Cultural Engagement, a non-profit devoted to dialogue and deliberation, and currently serves as its program developer.

Reception
Tina Fernandes Botts calls Barthold’s book on hermeneutic approach to gender "subtle" and "satisfying", "because it caringly and responsibly articulates what is good and right about current feminist thinking in the hermeneutic vein on the topic of social identity, while at the same time gently highlighting the ways in which this thinking diverges from Gadamer’s own thinking."

Books
 Overcoming Polarization in the Public Square: Civic Dialogue, Palgrave Macmillan, 2020
 A Hermeneutic Approach to Gender and Other Social Identities, Palgrave Macmillan, 2016
 Gadamer’s Dialectical Hermeneutics, Rowman and Littlefield, 2010

References

External links
Barthold at Endicott College

20th-century American philosophers
Philosophy academics
Living people
Gadamer scholars
1965 births
The New School alumni
Endicott College faculty
Gordon College (Massachusetts) faculty
Simon Fraser University alumni
George Washington University alumni
Regent College alumni
Hermeneutists
Heidegger scholars
Habermas scholars
Haverford College faculty
Siena College faculty